Nežka Mramor Kosta  is a Slovenian mathematician working at University of Ljubljana.
She is known for her work on computational logic and is a member of the Institute for Mathematics, Physics and Mechanics of Slovenia.

Selected publications 
 Neža Mramor Kosta, Mehmetcik Pamuk, Hanife Varli, Perfect discrete Morse functions on connected sums, arXiv:1501.06200
 Henry King, Kevin Knudson, Neža Mramor, Birth and death in discrete Morse theory, arXiv:0808.0051
 Borut Jurčič Zlobec, Neža Mramor Kosta, Geometric constructions on cycles in R'n, arXiv:1311.5656
 AYALA, Rafael, VILCHES, Jose Antonio, JERŠE, Gregor, MRAMOR KOSTA, Neža. Discrete gradient fields on infinite complexes. Discrete and continuous dynamical systems
 JERŠE, Gregor, MRAMOR KOSTA, Neža. Ascending and descending regions of a discrete Morse function. Computational geometry 
 MRAMOR KOSTA, Neža, TRENKLEROVÁ, Eva. Basic sets in the digital plane.  Lecture notes in computer science, ISSN 0302-9743, 4910, 2008, str. 376–387. 
 JAWOROWSKI, Jan, MRAMOR KOSTA, Neža. The degree of maps of free G-manifolds. Journal of fixed point theory and its applications, ISSN 1661-7738, 2007, vol. 2, no. 2, str. 209–213. 
 KING, Henry C., KNUDSON, Kevin, MRAMOR KOSTA, Neža. Generating discrete Morse functions from point data. Experimental mathematics, ISSN 1058-6458, 2005, vol. 14, no. 4, str. 435–444. 
 JURČIČ-ZLOBEC, Borut, MRAMOR KOSTA, Neža. Geometric constructions on cycles. Rocky Mountain journal of mathematics.
 CENCELJ, Matija, MRAMOR KOSTA, Neža, VAVPETIČ, Aleš. G-complexes with a compatible CW structure. Journal of mathematics of Kyoto University.

References 

21st-century Slovenian mathematicians
20th-century Slovenian mathematicians
Living people
Year of birth missing (living people)
Academic staff of the University of Ljubljana